Andrea Koreen Garcia Medina (born March 27, 1995 in Santa Rosa City, Laguna, Philippines) also known as Koreen Medina is a Filipino beauty pageant titleholder who was crowned Mutya ng Pilipinas Asia Pacific Int'l for Miss Intercontinental 2013. She competed at the Miss Intercontinental 2013 pageant in Magdeburg, (Germany) on December 14, 2013 where she placed 3rd runner-up.

Early life
Before joining pageantry, she was a Pilipinas Got Talent Season 2 contestant, the Grand Prize winner in the Coca-Cola Music Talent Search Finals in 2011, and the Grand Winner of "My Girl," a pageant-like search on ABS-CBN.

2013: Mutya ng Pilipinas and Miss Intercontinental
Koreen won the top title of Mutya ng Pilipinas Asia Pacific International 2013 title for Miss Intercontinental together with co-winner, Angeli Dione Barbas Gomez, Mutya ng Pilipinas Tourism International 2013 for Miss Tourism International 2013 at the Mutya ng Pilipinas 2013 pageant.

She placed 3rd runner-up and chosen as Miss Intercontinental Queen of Asia and Oceania at the Miss Intercontinental 2013 pageant on December 14, 2013 in Magdeburg, Germany.

2015: StarStruck
In 2015, Medina joined the sixth season of StarStruck wherein she was one of the semi-finalists until eventually revealed as part of the Top 28 contestants on the show's pilot episode. She was joined by Klea Pineda and Avery Paraiso in that announcement.

Filmography

Television

See also
 StarStruck (Philippine TV series)
 StarStruck (season 6)

References

External links
Koreen Medina on Instagram

Mutya ng Pilipinas winners
Filipino television actresses
Pilipinas Got Talent contestants
ABS-CBN personalities
Star Magic
GMA Network personalities
StarStruck (Philippine TV series) participants
The Voice of the Philippines contestants
1995 births
Living people
People from Santa Rosa, Laguna
People from Laguna (province)
Tagalog people